The River Glass is a river on the Isle of Man. The river begins in the area of Injebreck about 10km north of Douglas, the Island's capital. Flowing down through the West Baldwin Valley, the river joins the River Dhoo to form the River Douglas on the outskirts of Douglas before flowing out to sea. The river has a length of approximately 8.5km.

The name Glass originates from the word for green in Manx.

The western edge of the parish of Onchan is formed by the path of the Glass.

References 

Rivers of the Isle of Man